Imbricaria rufogyrata is a species of sea snail, a marine gastropod mollusc in the family Mitridae.

Description
The length of the shell varies between 23 mm and 35 mm.

Original description
 (of Subcancilla rufogyrata Poppe, Tagaro & Salisbury, 2009) Poppe G.T., Tagaro S. & Salisbury R. (2009) New species of Mitridae and Costellariidae from the Philippines. Visaya Suppl. 4: 1-86.

References

External links
 Worms Link
 Fedosov A., Puillandre N., Herrmann M., Kantor Yu., Oliverio M., Dgebuadze P., Modica M.V. & Bouchet P. (2018). The collapse of Mitra: molecular systematics and morphology of the Mitridae (Gastropoda: Neogastropoda). Zoological Journal of the Linnean Society. 183(2): 253-337

Mitridae
 Gastropods described in 2009